Hanbali is an Arabic nisba that means "of Hanbal", implying a follower of the Hanbali Madhhab.

People using it in their names it include:
 Ibn Hamdan al-Hanbali — Hanbalite Muslim scholar and judge.
 Diya al-Din al-Maqdisi al-Hanbali — Hanbali Islamic scholar.
 Ibn Rajab al-Hanbali — Hanbali Islamic scholar.
 Mujir al-Din al-Hanbali — Jerusalemite qadi and Palestinian historian.
 Ibn al-Imad al-Hanbali — Muslim historian and faqih of the Hanbali school.
 Muhammad Abd al-Rahim al-Hanbali (ar) — member of Izz ad-Din al-Qassam Brigades.

See also 
 Arabic name

Hanbali
Nisbas